Mobile Service Architecture (MSA) JSR 248 is a specification that describes an end-to-end wireless environment for Java ME.  MSA includes a full set of 16 JSRs and a subset of 8 JSRs:

MSA Subset
The MSA Subset includes the following JSRs:

MSA 
MSA includes the MSA Subset and the following JSRs:

See also

MIDlet

External links
The JSR 248 Specification
Sun's overview of the Mobile Service Architecture

Java device platform
Java specification requests